The Emiliano Tria Tirona Memorial National High School is a secondary public high school located in Gahak, Kawit, Cavite in the Philippines.

History 
In the second quarter of 1946. the late Mr. Roberto T. Tirona, Assistant Principal of Cavite High School (now Cavite National High School), Cavite City, proposed the idea of creating a junior high school in Kawit, Cavite to his immediate superior, Mr. Palaypay, as well as to Mr. Mr. Roman Lorenzo, Division Schools Superintendent at that time. This was in view of the over increasing enrollment of students coming from the towns of Noveleta, Kawit, Bacoor, Imus, Dasmarinas and Silang in Cavite which the Cavite High School could hardly accommodate. Moreover, Senator Emiliano Tria Tirona promised to allocate his Pork Barrel Fund of P500,000.00 (Five Hundred Thousand Pesos) for the construction of the school building and payment for the school site once the proposal was approved.

Eventually, the Kawit High School, with a faculty of 29 teachers and student population of 1, 200 was temporarily opened in June 1947 at the convent of the Kawit Parish Church (now Saint Mary Magdalene Parish).

In 1948, the kawit Junior High School became a fully-fledged high school and was renamed Kawit High School. It turned our its first graduates in 1949.

On April 5, 1950, the classes of Kawit High School were transferred to its new site at Gahak, Kawit, Cavite. It was renamed to Emiliano Tria Tirona Memorial National High School, in honor to its benefactor.

In 1962, the school was converted into a national high school through the efforts of the late Congressman Justiniano Montano and school principal, Mr. Guillermo Florencio.

External links 
Emiliano Tria Tirona

High schools in Cavite